This Is How It Is is the debut album from Original Flavor. The album was released on February 25 1992, by Atlantic. It was produced by Ski.

Track listing

References

1992 debut albums
Albums produced by Ski Beatz
Atlantic Records albums
Original Flavor albums